Department of Architecture and Landscape Design (formerly School of Architecture and Landscape Design), Shri Mata Vaishno Devi University is located in Kakryal Village near Katra town of Jammu and Kashmir. It is the only Architectural college in Jammu and Kashmir, making it one of the most important institutions in the state.

The School of Architecture was started in the year 2006. Dr. C.L. Razdan was the founding director of the department. It currently offers a five year Bachelor of Architecture course. The department has students from all over India.

History
The Department of Architecture & Landscape Design (DA&LD) started in 2006 with the first batch of 40 students. The first three years of the department were spent on shared basis in the buildings of other UG & PG schools of the University. Meanwhile, DA&LD faculty consider themselves fortunate to have got the job of designing the DA&LD building under the leadership of First Director of the School Prof. C.L.Razdan. the beautiful design of the building with passionate learning environment was soon ready on paper & the building was ultimately inaugurated on 4 December 2009 by the Chancellor SMVDU & hon’ble Governor of J&K sh. N.N.Vohra.

From the year 2006-2012, Prof. C.L. Razdan with his ideology, "Architecture is all about feeling", guided and nurtured the new institution to a level where it has made its name among the best institutes in the zone in a short span of time. The college has made its presence felt in the field through its regular participation in National Competitions, its participation in NASA Conventions and made it mark among other colleges by successful organization of Zonal NASA Convention – VOGUE in the year 2010.

Presently guided by Ar. Aditya K. Singh [Landscape Architect, S.P.A., Delhi], Director, the institute is experiencing the winds of positivity and change. The focus of the institute is to build the ‘sense of space’ among its students while trying to catch the ‘essence or the spirit of architecture’. Other guides are the architects like Ar. Abhiney Gupta, Ar. Navin Gupta, Ar. Abhimanyu Sharma, Ar. Anoop Sharma and Civil Engineering expert Er. V.K.Dogra.

Vision
To infuse confidence in the would-be-architect. In nutshell the Architect from the institute has to be made aware of the changing scene put forth by racing progress with its tools. Decadence in built-up-environment is a major concern. To feel concerned for the up gradation of the built-up-environment is the need of the hour.

An idea to start a school of Architecture came up in the year 2005-06 keeping in view that:
"The state has no Department of Architecture. The state is blessed with three distinct regions. Overall Development activity is on the increase. The development in hills is not organized and landscape is getting mutilated. The number of architects in totality is not much in relation to population. The areas of the state are prone to earthquake as the state falls in seismic zone IV. Elements of heritage are getting diluted. Any school of Architecture can be a catalyst in promoting architectural order. The aim of the department would be to create consciousness regarding Architecture, Environment, Built-up form, proper utilization of materials, and resources retaining heritage elements and lastly promoting sustainable development in hills."

References

External links

Official website
http://www.smvdu.ac.in/school-of-architecture-about.html
http://www.smvdu.ac.in
Governor inaugurates NASA convention at SMVDU
ZONAL NASA CONVENTION 2010
Governor for judicious land use while designing new buildings
https://web.archive.org/web/20111227001123/http://www.coa.gov.in/STATUS.pdf List of Architecture Schools in India Recognized by Council of Architecture,India
http://www.smvdubarch.blogspot.com
Lecture by Prof.Ravindra Bhan
School of Architecture and Landscape Design

Universities in Jammu and Kashmir
Architecture schools in India